Chinese Whispers is a 1987 novella by Maurice Leitch published as a Hutchinson Novella in Australia and the United Kingdom and as part of the Harper Short Novel Series in the United States. Chinese Whispers was filmed as a BBC Two television drama for the ScreenPlay series in 1989, directed by Stuart Burge, with a screenplay by Maurice Leitch and featuring Niall Buggy in the leading role of ‘Kenny’.

References

British novellas
1987 novels
Hutchinson (publisher) books
British novels adapted into films